Gaius Octavius (about 100 – 59 BC) was a Roman politician. He was an ancestor to the Roman Emperors of the Julio-Claudian dynasty. He was the father of the Emperor Augustus, step-grandfather of the Emperor Tiberius, great-grandfather of the Emperor Claudius, and great-great grandfather of the Emperors Caligula and Nero. Hailing from Velitrae, he was a descendant of an old and wealthy equestrian branch of the gens Octavia. At Rome his family was part of the wealthy plebeian caste, and not being of senatorial rank, he was a novus homo ("new man"). His grandfather, Gaius Octavius, fought as a military tribune in Sicily during the Second Punic War. His father, Gaius Octavius, was a municipal magistrate who lived to an advanced age.

Personal life
Octavius' first wife was named Ancharia. The two had a child named Octavia the Elder. It is not known how the marriage ended, although it is possible that Ancharia died during child birth. Octavius later married the niece of Julius Caesar, Atia. How they met is not known, although Atia's family on her father's side (the Atii Balbi) lived close to Velitrae, which was the ancestral home of the Octavii. They had two children: Octavia the Younger (b. 69 BC) and Gaius Octavius (b. 63 BC), who became Roman Emperor Augustus.

Political career

Some time before 73 BC, he had served as military tribune. He may have been elected quaestor some time around 73 BC and later plebeian aedile around 64 BC. His first clearly noted office was that of praetor in 61 BC.

In 60 BC, after his term as praetor had ended, he was appointed proconsul of Macedonia. However, before he left for Macedonia, the senate sent him to put down a slave rebellion in Thurii. These slaves had previously taken part in the rebellions led by Spartacus and Catiline. Octavius' victory over the slaves in Thurii led him to give his son, then a few years old, the cognomen of "Thurinus". He then left for Macedonia and proved to be a capable administrator, governing "courageously and justly". He was saluted imperator for his victories over the Bessi in Thrace in 59 BC.

 His career is summarized in an inscription erected by his son on the forum he built in Rome:

C(aius) Octavius C(ai)  C(ai) n(epos) C(ai) pr[on(epos)]
pater Augusti
tr(ibunus) mil(itum) bis q(uaestor) aed(ilis) pl(ebis) cum
C(aio) Toranio iudex quaestionum
pr(aetor) proco(n)s(ul) imperator appellatus
ex provincia Macedonia

“Gaius Octavius, son, grandson and great-grandson of Gaius,
father of Augustus,
twice military tribune, quaestor, aedile of the plebs together with
Gaius Toranius, judge,
praetor, proconsul, proclaimed imperator
in the province of Macedonia”

Family tree of the Octavii Rufi

Since the last Gaius Octavius (Augustus) was adopted by his great-uncle Julius Caesar and became one of the Julii Caesares, the family's original nomen gentile was not inherited by his only daughter (i.e. Julia the Elder) and adopted sons (i.e. Gaius Caesar, Lucius Caesar, Tiberius, Agrippa Postumus), which meant the end of the Octavii Rufi's male line.

See also
 Octavia gens
 Julio-Claudian family tree

Footnotes

Sources

 
 
 

100s BC births
59 BC deaths
1st-century BC Romans
Ancient Roman generals
Family of Augustus
Gaius
People from Velletri
Roman governors of Macedonia
Roman Republican praetors